The orders, decorations, and medals of Cuba are orders and medals awarded for exemplary service to the nation of Cuba. The current decoration system has 2 honorary titles, 22 orders, 49 medals, and 35 distinctions.

Honorary titles

Orders

Medals

Civil medals

Military medals

Historic

See also 
 Socialist orders of merit

References 

 
Cuba